This article contains the filmography of Hong Kong actor Chow Yun-fat.

Films

Television

Video Games

References

Male actor filmographies
Hong Kong filmographies